Liane Lippert (born 13 January 1998) is a German cyclist, who currently rides for UCI Women's WorldTeam .

Career
Born in Friedrichshafen, Lippert started her career in local club RSV Seerose Friedrichshafen in 2008. In the following years she won the U15 mountain category at Germany's former greatest mountain time track Lightweight Uphill. Since 2013 Lippert was nominated in the German squad until she got her first professional contract. She won the European junior road championship in 2016.

Lippert joined  in 2017, and achieved her first victory at UCI Women's World Tour level in the 2020 Cadel Evans Great Ocean Road Race.

Major results

2016
 1st  Road race, UEC European Junior Road Championships
 6th Overall Trophée d'Or Féminin
2017
 9th Overall Lotto Belgium Tour
2018
 1st  Road race, National Road Championships
 1st Overall Lotto Belgium Tour
 4th Overall Tour de Yorkshire
 6th Overall Thüringen Tour
1st  Young rider classification
2020
 1st Cadel Evans Great Ocean Road Race
 2nd Brabantse Pijl
 2nd Overall Tour Down Under
2021
 2nd  Road race, UEC European Road Championships
 4th Overall Thüringen Tour
 5th Overall Challenge by La Vuelta
 8th La Course by Le Tour de France
2022
 3rd Amstel Gold Race
 3rd Brabantse Pijl
 4th Overall Tour de Romandie
1st  Young rider classification
 4th Road race, UCI Road World Championships
 7th La Flèche Wallonne
 8th Liège–Bastogne–Liège
2023
 7th Strade Bianche

References

External links

1998 births
Living people
German female cyclists
People from Friedrichshafen
Sportspeople from Tübingen (region)
European Games competitors for Germany
Cyclists at the 2019 European Games
Olympic cyclists of Germany
Cyclists at the 2020 Summer Olympics
Cyclists from Baden-Württemberg
20th-century German women
21st-century German women